Al-Qadim: The Genie's Curse is an action role-playing game for the personal computer set in the Al-Qadim campaign setting of Advanced Dungeons and Dragons. The game was developed by Cyberlore Studios and published in 1994 by Strategic Simulations (SSI). The game combines role-playing game and adventure with a simplified interface; the player's character is a young corsair trying to clear his family's name, rescue his betrothed and determine who has been freeing genies from their masters.

Plot
A genie has been freed from his master's control by mysterious forces which are liberating genies for the Nameless Masters. As the story begins, the player character (the son of sultan Zubin Al-Hazrad of Zaratan) is a young corsair who has just completed his training. The corsair is betrothed to a caliph's daughter. The caliph and his daughter are involved in a hurricane-induced shipwreck, which sweeps the girl overboard. The corsair and his family are blamed for the shipwreck; he must find his bride-to-be and restore his family's honor. The character can interact with his family (including his parents and sister), working to save them from execution; they must also explore the mystery of who has been unleashing genies on the land, and investigate the Genie's Curse.

Gameplay
Unlike the games in SSI's Gold Box series, character generation is greatly simplified. The player chooses a name, by which they are known throughout the game. There is no race, class or skill selection, and play begins immediately. The single player character begins the game as a second-level corsair, whose statistics are predetermined; the player also cannot change his weapons or armor, although he can eventually improve his starting sword. The character earns experience points by solving puzzles and finishing quests, some of which do not involve combat. The character gains levels in exchange for experience points; gaining levels increases hit points, and grants the opportunity to learn new skills for combat.

The game features a simple interface, with icon menus instead of text. Character movement and most object manipulation are mouse-directed, although the player may use a keyboard or joystick. The player chooses all actions (except movement and projectile weapons) by pressing a single action key (or mouse button), which causes the character to automatically take the correct action with an object; the character either automatically picks up important objects or can take the object when the character looks at it. To talk to characters, or attack monsters with the scimitar, the player moves the character towards the target and clicks. The player selects the game's difficulty level of the game, which affects the monsters' power. At the beginning of the game, the player learns to maneuver the character by racing through a trap-filled dungeon hallway. Al-Qadim features simple, real-time combat, with the character using up to two weapons at a time. The character's scimitar can become more powerful with special objects, and his projectile weapon is a sling or magic shards which cast spells. If the character is injured, he can restore his hit points by drinking healing potions or be magically healed when he visits special locations.

The game places less emphasis on role-playing game elements (such as exploration, combat and magic), favoring adventure-game elements (such as problem-solving and object manipulation) and featuring a smaller world to explore. Travel is shown overhead, using ships and flying carpets. The character is visible in  three-quarter view, but they and the monsters are shown in side view when moving. In many areas, travel is one-directional. Conversations appear as text, and the player chooses sentences (or phrases) by clicking on them. The game features puzzles and mazes important to plot advancement.

Development
Developer Cyberlore hired a team to create The Genie's Curse shortly after the company was founded in 1992, and it took the company fourteen months to develop the game. It was designed by Herb Perez and produced by Lester Humphreys; the lead programmer was Ken Grey, the art was by Garrett McCarty and Herb Perez and the SSI producer was Bret Berry.

Publication history
Al-Qadim: The Genie's Curse (1994) was one of several games published by SSI from 1992 to 1994 in TSR's settings on a number of game engines, and was later included in the 1996 AD&D Masterpiece Collection compilation set.

For the MMORPG Dark Sun Online: Crimson Sands the developer used images from Al-Qadim to finish the title on time despite a low development budget.

The game was re-released in 2015 on GOG.com with support for Windows, macOS, and Linux.

Reception

Substituting for Scorpia, Petra Schlunk reviewed the game for Computer Gaming World. Stating that "SSI has taken a decisive step away from" products like Ravenloft and Dark Sun,  she reported that it was "not a standard role-playing game and it is not a standard adventure game. Al-Qadim is a story in which we get to play the main character". While decrying limited player options, Schlunk added that "the story is charming, graphically pleasing [...] of reasonable length [...] and worth 'playing'. In this game, elements of both role-playing and adventure games are blended cleverly with one of the most facile interfaces to date" Schlunk concluded, "Borrowing heavily from the Arabian Nights, Al-Qadim has captured the charm and wonder of those tales."

Computer Shopper praised the game, saying that it "managed to capture the feel of the Al-Qadim setting". The magazine noted the graphics and audio, calling both "typical high-quality SSI offerings"; the game's use of honor ("portrayed in a way that isn't trite") was also cited.

PC Gamer UKs Andy Butcher wrote, "Al-Qadim tries hard to be accessible, inoffensive and appeal to the masses, but ... it's unlikely to whet the appetites of either hardened role-players (it's far too superficial) or newcomers (it's got little of a really good RPG's appeal)." In PC Zone, David McCandless summarized the game as "not very good", with "poor" graphics and "awful" combat.

The Genie's Curse was reviewed in Dragon #208 (1994) by Sandy Petersen in the "Eye of the Monitor" column. Petersen gave the game four (out of five) stars: "Al-Qadim: The Genie's Curse is heaps of fun in an interesting and exotic environment."

Allen Rausch wrote for GameSpy that Al-Qadim: The Genie's Curse was "basically SSI's answer to Nintendo's Zelda games", but "it wasn't a very good answer ...as so often happens when a game tries to appeal to two very different audiences at the same time, neither element was entirely successful". He concluded that the game "had its moments, but it wasn't a game that ever approached the realm of 'classic'." In a similar review for GameSpot, Andrew Park and Elliott Chin felt that the game may not appeal to serious RPG fans.

Michael Hengst, editor of Power Play, called the combination of the 1001 Nights-style Al-Qadim setting with the action-packed gameplay of Zelda successful. Hengst and main tester Volker Weitz described its difficulty as low, and gave it an overall rating of 74 percent.

References

External links

1994 video games
Action role-playing video games
Al-Qadim
Cyberlore Studios games
DOS games
Forgotten Realms video games
Games commercially released with DOSBox
Linux games
MacOS games
Role-playing video games
Single-player video games
Strategic Simulations games
Video games based on Arabian mythology
Video games developed in the United States
Windows games